Thallarcha phalarota, the adorned footman, is a moth in the subfamily Arctiinae. It was described by Edward Meyrick in 1886. It is found in Australia, where it has been recorded from the Australian Capital Territory, New South Wales, Queensland and Victoria.

The wingspan is about 10 mm. The forewings are black with two white bands.

References

Moths described in 1886
Lithosiini